Sikhonkino is a rural locality (a selo) in Kabakovsky Selsoviet, Karmaskalinsky District, Bashkortostan, Russia. The population was 891 as of 2010. There are 7 streets.

Geography 
Sikhonkino is located 25 km northwest of Karmaskaly (the district's administrative centre) by road. Verkhnetimkino is the nearest rural locality.

References 

Rural localities in Karmaskalinsky District